Aloe mubendiensis  is a species of Aloe native to west Uganda.

References

mubendiensis
Plants described in 1942
Flora of Uganda